Perkowski is a surname. Notable people with the surname include:

David Perkowski (born 1947), American swimmer
Harry Perkowski (1922–2016), American baseball player
Jack Perkowski, American businessman and writer
Jan L. Perkowski, American academic and writer
Piotr Perkowski (1901–1990), Polish composer